Albert Harris (16 September 1912 – 1995) was an English footballer who made 92 appearances in the Football League playing on the wing for Hull City, Newcastle United, Barnsley and Darlington in the 1930s. He also played for Wearside League clubs Hetton United, Herrington Swifts, and Blackhall Colliery Welfare, and for Scunthorpe & Lindsey United.

Harris represented Durham Schools at under-15 level, playing for the team for two seasons, 1925–26 and 1926–27, rather than the customary one.

In the 1937–38 season, Harris and fellow forward Albert Brallisford were invited to "explain their recent poor form" to Darlington's chairman and manager; while Harris's Darlington career continued, Brallisford never played for the club again.

References

1912 births
1995 deaths
People from Horden
Footballers from County Durham
English footballers
Association football outside forwards
Hull City A.F.C. players
Blackhall Colliery Welfare F.C. players
Newcastle United F.C. players
Barnsley F.C. players
Darlington F.C. players
Scunthorpe United F.C. players
English Football League players
Date of death missing